Polyipnus stereope is a species of ray-finned fish in the family Sternoptychidae.

References

Sternoptychidae
Fish of East Asia
Fish described in 1904